Conscription in South Africa was established in 1967 and abolished in 1994 via a constitutional amendment.

See also 
 End Conscription Campaign
 South African Defence Force

References

Military history of South Africa
South Africa